Muriel Gardiner Buttinger (née Morris; November 23, 1901 – February 6, 1985) was an American psychoanalyst and psychiatrist.

Early life and career
Gardiner was born on November 23, 1901, in Chicago, the daughter of Edward Morris, president of the Morris & Company meat-packing business, and Helen (née Swift) Morris, a member of the family which owned Swift & Company, another meat-packing firm (her parents eventually divorced and her mother remarried to British politician and playwright Francis Neilson). She was born into a family of wealth and privilege.

After graduating from Wellesley College in 1922 she traveled to Europe where she lived until the outbreak of World War II. She attended the University of Oxford and then, in 1926, went to Vienna, hoping to study psychoanalysis and be analyzed by Sigmund Freud. She received a degree in medicine from the University of Vienna and married Joseph Buttinger, leader of the Austrian Revolutionary Socialists.

In 1934, she became involved in anti-Fascist activities. Using the code name "Mary", she smuggled passports and money and offered her home as a safe house for anti-Fascist dissidents, activities which she described in her memoir Code Name Mary: Memoirs of an American Woman in the Austrian Underground (1983). At the outbreak of World War II on September 1, 1939, Gardiner, Buttinger and their daughter moved to the United States.

Gardiner edited The Wolf-Man by the Wolf-Man, which documents the case history of a wealthy young Russian who went to Vienna in 1910 to be analyzed by Freud and who became the subject of Freud's History of an Infantile Neurosis. Gardiner met Freud only once, but she knew the "Wolf-Man" in Vienna, and Code Name Mary carries a foreword by Freud's daughter, Anna Freud. In 1976, she authored a study of teenage violence called The Deadly Innocents.

In 1983, Gardiner became entangled in the controversy between Mary McCarthy and Lillian Hellman, when she claimed that she was the character called Julia in Hellman's memoirs, Pentimento (1973), and in the movie Julia based on a chapter of that book. Hellman, who never met Gardiner, claimed that her "Julia" was somebody else.

Gardiner wrote that, while she never met Hellman, she had often heard about her from a friend, Wolf Schwabacher, who was Hellman's lawyer. In Gardiner's account, Schwabacher had visited Gardiner in Vienna and, after Muriel Gardiner, Joseph Buttinger and their daughter moved into their house at Brookdale Farm in Hopewell Township near Pennington, New Jersey, in 1940, the house was divided with the Gardiner-Buttinger family living in one half and Wolf and Ethel Schwabacher in the other for more than ten years. Most people believed that Hellmann based her story on Gardiner's life. Gardiner's editor cited the unlikelihood that there were two millionaire American women who were medical students and anti-Nazi activists in Vienna in the late 1930s.

Personal life and death
She was briefly married to physician Harold Abramson in 1925.  Her second husband was British artist Julian Benedict Orde Gardiner (1903-1982); they had a daughter, Constance, whom she raised in Vienna before sending her to New York City to live with her sister, Dr. Ruth Morris Bakwin, a pediatrician married to Dr. Harry Bakwin. She married Joseph Buttinger before the couple fled Europe in 1939.  Muriel Gardiner died of cancer on February 6, 1985, in Princeton, New Jersey, aged 83.

Legacy
Muriel-Gardiner-Buttinger-Platz in Vienna is named in her honour.
 The Western New England Psychoanalytic Society in  New Haven, Connecticut, runs a series of monthly meetings called the Muriel Gardiner Program in Psychoanalysis and the Humanities.

References

Further reading
Sheila Isenberg, Muriel's War: An American Heiress In The Austrian Resistance, Palgrave, 2010,

External links
Photograph of Muriel Gardiner

1901 births
1985 deaths
20th-century American physicians
20th-century American women physicians
Alumni of the University of Oxford
American expatriates in Austria
American people of British descent
American people of German-Jewish descent
American psychiatrists
American women psychiatrists
Analysands of Ruth Mack Brunswick
Deaths from cancer in New Jersey
Morris family (meatpacking)
Physicians from Chicago
People from Mercer County, New Jersey
University of Vienna alumni
Wellesley College alumni